Leporacanthicus triactis is a species of armored catfish native to Colombia and Venezuela, where it is found in the upper Orinoco River basin.  This species grows to a length of  SL.

Ecology
L. triactis has been found in deep holes in mud banks and spawns in caves.

References 

Ancistrini
Freshwater fish of Colombia
Fish of Venezuela
Fish described in 1992